The 1892–93 season was the first season in Liverpool Football Club's existence, and their first year in the Lancashire League and the FA Cup.

First team

Transfers

In

Match results

Lancashire League

FA Cup

Other games

Notes

References

External links
LFC History Season 1892-93

1892-1893
English football clubs 1892–93 season